This is a timeline of BBC Radio London, a BBC Local Radio station broadcasting to London.

Radio London

 1970
 6 October – BBC Radio London launches. It is the fourth station to launch as part of the BBC's second wave of BBC Local Radio stations and the 12th local station to go on air.

 1971
 No events.

 1972
 No events.

 1973
 8 October – The station faces commercial competition for the first time when the UK's first Independent Local Radio station, LBC, launches.

 1974
Robbie Vincent launches a late-night phone-in called Late Night London.
 22 November –  The first regular programme for the black community Black Londoners launches, presented by Alex Pascall. The programme was initially launched as a trial run of six programmes before becoming a weekly fixture in the schedules.

 1975
No events.

 1976
12 September – The first edition of London Sounds Eastern is broadcast. and is the first Asian programme to be broadcast in English by the BBC. It replaces two 30-minute shows which had been broadcast in the Bengali, Hindi and Urdu languages. 

 1977
May – Robbie Vincent moves from Late Night London to the lunchtime show, swapping with David Simmons who moves to the late evening show in August.

 1978
8 May – Black Londoners launches as a daily programme, having previously been a weekly Friday night programme.

 1979
17 August – After more than five years on air, Late Night London is broadcast for the final time. It is not replaced and from the 20th, weekday programming ends at 10pm. Consequently, BBC Radio 2's output from 10:00 pm to midnight is heard across London on VHF as Radio 2's VHF frequencies are handed over to BBC Radio 1 for the John Peel and Tommy Vance shows.
17 November – BBC Radio London makes major changes to its weekday programming. Home Run, which had been on air since the station's launch, is replaced by London News Desk and a new arts-based programme called Stop, Look, Listen, London Live moves from mid-morning to early afternoon and is replaced in mid-morning by The Robbie Vincent Telephone Programme with Rush Hour extended by an hour. The evening shows are dropped with weeknight programming ending at 8pm instead of 10pm with some of the displaced programmes moving to Sunday afternoons.

 1980
 No events.

 1981
 11 February – BBC Radio London begins broadcasting in stereo.
 The station is relaunched. It adopts an easy listening format with music ranging from softer contemporary pop from artists such as The Carpenters to light classical music. Despite being unpopular with employed staff, who thought it very un-hip, and politicians who would question the need for a local radio station to sound like the two music-based BBC national networks, the relaunch led to improved audience figures and a string of awards and accolades.
 Tony Blackburn joins the station to present the afternoon programme.

 1982
 No events.

 1983
 Robbie Vincent leaves. He had been at the station since its launch.

 1984
 The station is relaunched with the tagline The Heart and Soul of London, with more soul music being played during the day. Changes include Tony Blackburn taking over the mid-morning show, as Blackburn rejoins following his departure from BBC Radio 1.

 1985
 London Sounds Eastern ends after nine years on air.

 1986
 No events.

 1987 
No events.

 1988
 Tony Blackburn is dismissed.
 7 October – At 7pm, Radio London stops broadcasting after 18 years on air.

Greater London Radio
 1988
 7 October – Test transmissions for Greater London Radio (GLR) begin.
 25 October – At 6am, BBC GLR launches. Put together by new Managing Editor Matthew Bannister and Programme Director Trevor Dann, the station is aimed at 25- to 45-year-olds and is on air daily from 6.30am until midnight. Early promotions use the phrase "rock 'n' rolling news" with a music mix best described as Adult album alternative and travel news every 20 minutes. The new weekday line-up consisted of Nick Abbot at breakfast, Emma Freud presenting the mid-morning show, Johnnie Walker at lunchtime, Tommy Vance hosting Drivetime and Dave Pearce hosting an evening club music show.
A number of specialist speech programmes launch, many of them broadcasting as a MW opt-out. They are aimed at London's communities: Asian, Afro-Caribbean, Jewish, Gay and Irish. Black London was presented by The Ranking Miss P and Lavender Lounge, the programme for the gay community, was presented by comedian Amy Lamé.

 1989
 January – Danny Baker joins the station as presenter of the weekend breakfast show.
 Janice Long joins the station to present the breakfast show, hosting the programme until 1991. She replaces Nick Abbot.
 GLR sets up a youth-based radio training facility at Vauxhall College, SW8, which was followed by a second course based at White City.
Vanessa Feltz joins.

 1990
 Chris Evans makes his on-air debut, having spent the previous year producing Danny Baker’s programme. Initially presenting a Saturday afternoon before moving to a weeknight evening show called The Greenhouse.
 Summer – Dave Pearce leaves the station to join new commercial music station Kiss 100. 
 November – Johnnie Walker was dismissed after making the comment that people would be "dancing in the streets" about the resignation of Margaret Thatcher as prime minister.

 1991
 Managing Editor Matthew Bannister leaves. He is replaced by Trevor Dann.
 Kevin Greening and Jeremy Nicholas both replace Janice Long as presenter of the breakfast show, as Janice herself leaves the station.
 During 1991 the station is given three years to prove itself or face closure. The threat is lifted after the BBC deemed it sufficiently patronised to remain on-air.

 1992
 No events.

 1993
 April – Chris Evans, Jonathan Coleman and Kevin Greening all leave the station to join Virgin 1215.
 BBC GLR is forced to introduce all-speech programmes at breakfast and drivetime. Trevor Dann resigns in protest of the change.
 Autumn – BBC GLR stops broadcasting on MW.
 Dotun Adebayo joins the station to present Black London.
 Danny Baker leaves for a while to join BBC Radio 1.

 1994.
 Summer –  Bob Harris joins the station to present the Saturday late show, later hosting the mid-evening show on Monday to Wednesday evenings.
Big George Webley and Robert Elms join.

 1995
 Phill Jupitus joins.

 1996
Danny Baker rejoins and Big George leaves the station after suffering a heart attack whilst on the air.

 1997
 April – Norman Jay joins.

 1998
 Danny Baker and Bob Harris leave.

 1999
Following a consultation exercise on local broadcasting in the South East, the BBC decided to rebrand GLR and substantially change the programming. A campaign to "Save GLR" is organised and a petition delivered to the BBC. Although the campaign was unsuccessful in saving GLR, and the rebranding went ahead the next year, it demonstrated the existence of a loyal audience for its format.

London Live 94.9
 2000
 25 March – BBC London Live 94.9 replaces GLR. Promising even more speech and less music, the station launches with new on-air personalities and new shows, including a speech-heavy breakfast show and a mid-morning phone-in and debate. Only drivetime and the specialist shows would remain, albeit refreshed. Lisa I'Anson, Vanessa Feltz and Eddie Nestor join. 
 July – The station starts broadcasting via DAB.
 Phill Jupitus leaves.

BBC London 94.9
 2001
 1 October – 
BBC London Live changes its name to BBC London 94.9 and the presenter line-up is changed. The change sees a new presenter line-up. Danny Baker joins to present a Saturday morning show, which is co-hosted with American comedian Amy Lamé. Jon Gaunt then hosted the mid-morning phone-in show. Vanessa Feltz replaces Lisa I'Anson in the afternoon slot with Eddie Nestor and Kath Melandri presenting drivetime. The changes also see Tony Blackburn return to present a Saturday classic soul music and chat show.
The station becomes the first BBC local station to begin live streaming on the internet.

 2002
 March –  Danny Baker becomes the new presenter of the breakfast show.

 2003
A number of specialist shows are axed. 
October – JoAnne Good joins to present the overnight programme.
Lisa I'Anson leaves.

 2004
Tony Blackburn rejoins the station.

2005
 25 July – Jonathan Coleman rejoins to present the 3–5pm Afternoon show on BBC London 94.9. 
 17 October – JoAnne Good and Jonathan Coleman take over as presenters of the breakfast show. They replace Danny Baker who moves to the afternoon slot.
 The station starts broadcasting on Sky in the London area. It can also be accessed elsewhere in the UK and Ireland by manual tuning.

2006
 August – Big George returns.
 Late 2006  – Jonathan Coleman leaves the station.

 2007
 No events.

 2008 
February – Norman Jay leaves following a decision to move his show to a "digital only slot".

 2009
 No events.

 2010
11 January – The first edition of The Late Show with Joanne Good is broadcast and Gaby Roslin joins on a full-time basis to replace JoAnne as co-host of the breakfast show with Paul Ross.
23 April - Nikki Bedi joins.

 2011
No events.

2012
24 November – The final edition of The Late Show with Joanne Good is broadcast.
25 November – A line-up change takes place. JoAnne Good moves to the afternoon show, replacing Danny Baker who leaves the station. and Simon Lederman takes over the weeknight late show.

2013
2 January – Penny Smith replaces Gaby Roslin as co-presenter of the breakfast show. Other schedule changes see JoAnne Good move to the mid-afternoon programme with Simon Lederman taking over the weeknight late show and Nikki Bedi taking over the weekend late show.
5 January – The BBC Local Radio stations begin a new Saturday evening show titled BBC Introducing. Hosted by a local presenter on each station, the programme's aim is to promote musicians from the area.
7 January – The debut of the BBC's networked evening programme takes place, hosted by former Classic FM presenter Mark Forrest. The show replaces all local programming, apart from local sport coverage.

2014
No events.

2015
5 July – Duncan Barkes joins to present "London's Late Night Radio Phone-in".

BBC Radio London
2015
6 October – After 27 years, the name BBC Radio London returns to the airwaves.

2016
4 January – Vanessa Feltz becomes the new breakfast show presenter. She replaces Penny Smith who leaves the station to join Talk Radio, and Nikki Bedi moves to the weekday early show. Other changes see Robert Elms taking over the mid-morning show and Eddie Nestor hosting drivetime.
25 February – Tony Blackburn was dismissed by the BBC.
Paul Ross leaves after six years of broadcasting.

2017
1 January – Tony Blackburn returns, and was rehired by the BBC.
8 October – In a speech marking the 50th anniversary of BBC local radio, The Director-General of the BBC, Tony Hall, announces that the national evening show will be axed, resulting in local programming returning to BBC Radio London weeknight evenings.

2018
26 November – Following the decision to reinstate local programmes on weeknights, BBC Radio London launches The Scene, which is described as "a platform for London’s community arts, entertainment and cultural activities, featuring new talent and emerging artists, performers and creators." Six new presenters are recruited to host the show.

2019
22 April – Nikki Bedi leaves.

2020
 23 March-5 July – BBC Radio London's overnight programming is heard across the UK following a decision by the BBC to broadcast a single UK-wide overnight show so that it can prioritise resources during the COVID-19 pandemic. The show is broadcast on all BBC Local Radio stations and on BBC Radio 5 Live.
6 July – BBC Radio 5 Live stops relaying overnight broadcasting from BBC Radio London on weeknights but continues to simulcast BBC Radio London on Friday and Saturday overnights.

2021
 13 September – BBC Radio London's daytime schedule is revamped. Eddie Nestor takes over the Mondays to Thursdays editions of the mid-morning show with Robert Elms presenting the show from Fridays to Sundays. Former GB Olympic athlete Jeanette Kwakye presents afternoons Monday – Thursday and JoAnne Good returns to the late show, presenting the programme four nights a week.

2022
26 August – Vanessa Feltz presents her final show for BBC Radio London after more than two decades at the station.
 31 October – Salma El-Wardany succeeds Vanessa Feltz as presenter of the breakfast show from Mondays to Thursdays, with Riz Lateef presenting on Fridays.

See also 
 Timeline of BBC Local Radio

References

BBC Local Radio
Local Radio
BBC Radio London